Vampires Suck is a 2010 American parody vampire film written and directed by Jason Friedberg and Aaron Seltzer. It stars Jenn Proske, Matt Lanter, Christopher N. Riggi, Ken Jeong, Anneliese van der Pol, and Arielle Kebbel. The film is a parody of The Twilight Saga franchise (mainly the original film and its sequel, New Moon). Like the previous Friedberg and Seltzer movies, the film was panned by critics for its humor and plot. 20th Century Fox theatrically released the film on August 18, 2010.

Plot
Edward Sullen strips off his clothes during the saint Salvatore festival while Becca Crane rushes to stop him. While running through a fountain, she accidentally splashes water around, causing people to party in the fountain and thus stopping Becca. In a flashback, Becca Crane moves to the Pacific Northwestern town of Sporks to live with her clueless father, Sheriff Frank, after her mother starts an affair with Tiger Woods. Meanwhile, a killing spree is attributed to the Canadians, but the real perpetrators are a group of vampires usually mistaken for the Black Eyed Peas. Becca quickly befriends many students at her new high school, including Jennifer. She is also intrigued by the mysterious and aloof Edward Sullen, whose odd behavior perplexes her during their biology class.

Later, when Becca is nearly struck by a van in the school parking lot, Edward stops the vehicle by thrusting another student in the van's way. Becca later "dreams" Edward was in her room; in truth he is, but is repulsed by things she does while sleeping. After much research and thought, Becca confronts Edward and tells him she thinks that he is one of the Jonas Brothers. Edward corrects her, saying he is a vampire but that he only consumes animal blood. Despite the danger of being around a vampire, Becca agrees to go to prom with Edward. Later, Becca and Edward kiss passionately in her room. Becca attempts to seduce Edward into having sex, but he abstains.

On Becca's birthday, Edward introduces her to his vampire family. While unwrapping a gift, Becca gets a paper cut. Edward's brother Jeremiah attempts to bite her, but is knocked away. To keep his family away from Becca, Edward distracts them and takes her out to the woods. He then proceeds to break up with Becca, who throws a tantrum after he leaves. Much to her expectance, Becca is attacked by three nomadic vampires, but Edward intervenes and saves her.

Edward's departure leaves Becca heartbroken for months, but she is comforted by her deepening friendship with her childhood friend Jacob White. When Becca is accosted in the woods by the nomadic vampires again, Jacob transforms into a Chihuahua as his werewolf pack arrives to save her. Meanwhile, Edward has moved to Rio and is now dating Lady Gaga to get over losing Becca. He is later informed by his sister Iris, via her gift of prophecy, that Becca killed herself. Edward becomes depressed and decides to provoke the "Zolturi", a powerful and narcissistic vampire coven, into killing him by exposing himself in the sunlight in front of humans, thus exposing the existence of vampires. Iris has another vision of Becca's survival as he leaves, but she is unable to warn him.

Iris arrives at Becca's house, and tells her that she has to save Edward by showing him that she is still alive. To Becca's shock, the Zolturi are currently partying at the prom due to the St. Salvatore theme. Jacob appears and demands that Becca choose between him and Edward, but just before she announces her decision, he is distracted by a cat and runs off to chase it. Upon arriving at the prom, Becca is caught between the warring factions of Edward fangirls and Jacob fangirls. She is unable to reach Edward before he exposes himself, figuratively and literally. However, twilight occurs, followed by a new moon and an eclipse, concealing Edward's vampiric nature as Becca gets him to safety. Frank arrives to check on Becca, making her hopeful; however, he thinks supernatural creatures are the prom theme and leaves. After a fight between him and the Zolturi leader, Daro, Edward is forced to turn Becca into a vampire, at risk of being killed horribly. He agrees to do so only on the condition that she marry him, which she accepts.

In the mid-credits scene, Edward is struck on the head by the leader of Jacob's fangirls. Edward survives the blow, and the girl is attacked by the newly vampirized Becca as the movie concludes.

Cast

 Jenn Proske as Becca Crane
 Matt Lanter as Edward Sullen
 Christopher N. Riggi as Jacob White
 Ken Jeong as Daro
 Anneliese van der Pol as Jennifer
 Diedrich Bader as Sheriff Frank Crane
 Arielle Kebbel as Rachel
 B. J. Britt as Antoine
 Charlie Weber as Jack
 Crista Flanagan as Eden
 Kelsey Legin (credited as Kelsey Ford) as Iris
 Jun Hee Lee as Derric
 David DeLuise as Fisherman Scully
 Ike Barinholtz as Bobby White (uncredited)
 Dave Foley as Principal Smith
 Randal Reeder as Biker Dude
 Nick Eversman as Jeremiah Sullen
 Zane Holtz as Alex
 Krystal Mayo as Buffy the Vampire Slayer

Parodies

Films and TV shows 

 The Twilight Saga (main parody) (2008–2010)
 Buffy the Vampire Slayer (1997–2003)
 True Blood (2008–2014)
 Alice in Wonderland (2010)
 Jersey Shore (2009–2012)
 The Vampire Diaries (2007–2009)

Real-life people 

 Black Eyed Peas
 Lady Gaga
 Tiger Woods
 Chris Brown

Release
Vampires Suck was released on August 18, 2010, in the United States, Canada and Russia, on August 26 in Australia and on October 15 in the United Kingdom. 20th Century Fox did not provide advance screenings of the film for critics.

Critical response

On Rotten Tomatoes the film has an approval rating of 4% based on reviews from 91 critics. The consensus reads: "Witlessly broad and utterly devoid of laughs, Vampires Suck represents a slight step forward for the Friedberg-Seltzer team." Metacritic, gave it a weighted average score of 18 out of 100 based on reviews from 17 critics, indicating "overwhelming dislike", the worst score for a wide release in 2010. Audiences polled by CinemaScore gave the film an average grade of "C+" on an A+ to F scale.

Spill.com, whose video reviews are usually around five minutes long and censored, had a twenty-second review which consisted of Korey Coleman staring blankly into the camera before uttering, "Fuck you" (which is the lowest rating the website gives) uncensored. In the audio commentary from the site, Coleman stated, "The films that these two directors make are so blatant at being nothing more than a juvenile finger pointing at an image or mention of a popular trend that, to me, they seem exploitive of a young culture raised to have an ever-decreasing attention span, thanks to the Internet and channel surfing and, this may sound a little crazy, but, I think it shows a slight de-evolution in what people will accept as entertainment." Peter Travers of Rolling Stone gave the film zero out of four stars, and wrote a four word-long review, which simply stated: "This movie sucks more." Film critic Mark Kermode reviewed the film on his Radio 5 show, prefacing the review by saying "It's no surprise to know that it's all terrible, witless, boring, terror". He criticized the film for what he perceived as stale subject matter, saying that the Twilight franchise had left the public consciousness and was no-longer fit for parody, "It's not just that the ship has sailed; it's that the ship has sailed, gone across the Atlantic, hit an iceberg, sunk, been dragged up by at least one company, been turned into the biggest movie hit ever, and is now currently being retrofitted for 3D for an anniversary re-release."

Another review from Collider's Jake Horowitz said that "not a single thing in its dreadful 82 minutes running time is even remotely worth watching, or considered even slightly entertaining." He then wrote that "no amount of review can make up for what I witnessed while watching Vampires Suck. How wrong I was to assume that it was even watchable, because with each over-done hit on the head or kick in the balls I cringed at the thought of this movie making nearly $80 million worldwide; and imagining people actually laughing in a theatre somewhere."

Despite the overwhelming negativity, Jenn Proske's mimicry performance based on Kristen Stewart received some praise; Steve Persall of Tampa Bay Times stated, "One thing the movie roasts to perfection is Kristen Stewart's overly pensive Bella... A newcomer named Jenn Proske has the mumbling, hair-twisting, lip-biting tics down pat, and her expressions of repressed sexuality are almost as funny as Stewart's." Entertainment Weekly said, "The exception is newcomer Jenn Proske, who spoofs Twilight star Kristen Stewart's flustered, hair-tugging angst with hilarious precision."

Vampires Suck was given four nominations from the Golden Raspberry Awards, including Worst Picture, Worst Director, Worst Screenplay and Worst Prequel, Remake, Rip-Off or Sequel.

Box office
In the United States, the film opened at number one on August 18 with $4,016,858. On August 19, the film dropped to #3 behind The Expendables and Eat Pray Love with $2,347,044. By the weekend, Vampires Suck landed at #2 behind The Expendables and $200,000 over Eat Pray Love. The full second week the film dropped to #11, grossing no more than $500 per theater, respectively. In its second weekend, the film dropped more than 50% from its opening weekend but rose to #6. As of July 12, 2012, the film has grossed $80,547,866 worldwide.

See also
 Vampire film

References

External links

 
 
 
 

20th Century Fox films
2010 films
2010 horror films
2010s parody films
2010s teen comedy films
American parody films
American slapstick comedy films
American comedy horror films
American supernatural horror films
American teen comedy films
Dune Entertainment films
Films about proms
Films directed by Jason Friedberg and Aaron Seltzer
Films produced by Peter Safran
Films scored by Christopher Lennertz
Films shot in Louisiana
Regency Enterprises films
Vampire comedy films
American werewolf films
Works based on Twilight (novel series)
Parodies of horror
2010 comedy films
American vampire films
2010s English-language films
2010s American films